Camuns is a village in the municipality of Suraua, in the canton of Grisons, Switzerland. It used to be an independent municipality before merging on 1 January 2002 to become part of Suraua.

References

External links

Camuns coat of arms

Lumnezia
Former municipalities of Graubünden
Villages in Graubünden